The France men's national ball hockey team is the men's national ball hockey team of France, and a member of the International Street and Ball Hockey Federation (ISBHF).

World Championships

External links 
https://web.archive.org/web/20120311155325/http://hockeyballfrance.fr/
 ISBHF Official Site

Ball hockey
Men's sport in France
National sports teams of France